Otto Riedl Tenement is a habitation building located at 2 Świętojańska Street, in Bydgoszcz, Poland.

Location 
The building stands on the western side of Gdańska street at the intersection with Świętojańska Street.
It stands close to remarkable tenements in the same street:

 Tenement at 71 Gdanska street;
 Tenement at 75 Gdanska street;
  Ernst Bartsch tenement at 79;
 Paul Storz Tenement at 81;
 Rudolf Kern Tenement.

History
The house was built in 1911–1912 for the baker Otto Riedel, according to a design by the architect Paul Sellner.

Paul Sellner has been a student of the architect Karl Bergner. In 1904, he opened his own architectural study office in Bromberg, where he stayed at least until 1922.
In Bydgoszcz Paul Sellner also designed, the building at Gdanska Street 95 in 1912–1913.

Otto Riedel moved to Świętojańska Street 2, then 48 Danzigerstrasse, in 1891 to establish his bakery. He had the house rebuilt in 1911–1912 and kept his business running in the new building.

The edifice also housed a hardware store,  since 1915. Otto Riedel lived there until at least 1933. There is still today a hardware store ("Drogeria Aster") at this address.

Vincent Bigoński established here his bakery in 1924. After his death, his son and now his grand-niece have been running the shop at Gdańska Street till 2020.

Architecture
The house reflects the architectural characteristic of years 1900–1910, as far as early Modern architecture is concerned.

The building block is massive, in that way it balances the symmetry with the opposite building.

Both facades have a modest decoration but it is underlined by various components (pilasters, balconies).

Gallery

See also

 Bydgoszcz
 Gdanska Street in Bydgoszcz
 Paul Sellner
  Downtown district in Bydgoszcz

References

Bibliography

External links
   Newspaper article on the Bigoński  family

Buildings and structures on Gdańska Street, Bydgoszcz
Residential buildings completed in 1912
1912 establishments in Germany
Modernist architecture in Bydgoszcz